Marcus H. Hinton (born December 27, 1971) is a former American football tight end who played one season with the Oakland Raiders of the National Football League. He played college football at Alcorn State University and attended Stone High School in Wiggins, Mississippi. He was also a member of the New Orleans Saints, Berlin Thunder and New York/New Jersey Hitmen.

References

External links
Just Sports Stats

Living people
1971 births
Players of American football from Mississippi
American football tight ends
African-American players of American football
Alcorn State Braves football players
Oakland Raiders players
Berlin Thunder players
New York/New Jersey Hitmen players
People from Wiggins, Mississippi
21st-century African-American sportspeople
20th-century African-American sportspeople